Alexandra Artourovna Yatchenko (born March 11, 1995), known professionally as Sasha Alex Sloan (previously Sasha Sloan), is an American singer-songwriter. Her debut album, Only Child, was released on October 16, 2020. It was met with critical acclaim by music critics, deeming it as a solid and outspoken debut album. Sloan's second studio album I Blame the World was released on May 13, 2022.

Life and career

1995–2014: Early life and background
Sloan grew up outside of Boston and taught herself to play on a piano her mother purchased when she was five. Her grandparents lived in Siberia, Russia, and she spent summers on their farm there as a child. When Sloan was nineteen, she moved to Los Angeles to pursue a career as a songwriter; she worked at a coffee shop to support herself. She made her US national TV debut on The Late Show with Stephen Colbert on February 6, 2019.

2015–2017: Beginnings
In 2015, Sloan was featured in the song "Phoenix" by Kaskade, as well as being credited for songwriting. Sloan continued her career by writing for artists including Idina Menzel, Maggie Lindemann and Camila Cabello.
In 2017, Sloan was featured in the song "This Town" by Kygo, which she also cowrote.

2018: Sad Girl and Loser
Her debut EP, Sad Girl, was released by RCA on April 18, 2018.

Her second EP, Loser, was released by RCA on November 29, 2018. On the same day, she announced her first headlining tour to support the album. Her single "Older" from the album was performed on The Late Show with Stephen Colbert on February 6, 2019.

2019–present: Self-Portrait and Only Child 
Sloan released her third EP Self-Portrait on October 18, 2019. She stated that "this EP is more about being OK with the fact that I have a lot of anxiety, and that I don’t want to go to parties."

On April 3, 2020, Sloan released the single "I'll Wait" produced by Kygo for his album Golden Hour. The following day, a music video was released starring American couple Rob Gronkowski and Camille Kostek containing personal footage of their life together.

On August 3, Sloan announced that her debut album Only Child would be released in the fall, with the lead single "Lie" released on August 7. On August 25 she released the song "House With No Mirrors" as the second single from her debut album. On August 28 she announced that her debut album Only Child would be released on October 16.

On November 17, Sloan announced a collaboration with singer/songwriter Charlie Puth, a song called "Is It Just Me?", which would be released on November 19, 2020.

On April 22, 2021, Sasha teamed up with country superstar Sam Hunt to release an acoustic-driven song titled "when was it over?" that finds Hunt and Sloan in a post-breakup state of misery questioning the cause of their respective romantic splits. Sloan said that the track is about not being able to let go of someone even when you know there's nothing left. The song was co-written with Shane McAnally who came up with the song's title. Other co-writers include King Henry and Emi Dragoi.

Discography

Studio albums

Extended plays

Singles

As lead artist

As featured artist

Other charted or certified songs

Songwriting credits

Tour

References

Further reading

External links 
 Official website

Living people
American women singer-songwriters
21st-century American singers
21st-century American women singers
1995 births
American people of Russian descent
Musicians from Boston
Singer-songwriters from Massachusetts